Cynthia Delores Tucker (née Nottage; October 4, 1927 – October 12, 2005) was an American politician and civil rights activist. She had a long history of involvement in the American Civil Rights Movement. From the 1990s onward, she engaged in a campaign against gangsta rap music.

Early life and education

Born in Philadelphia to a minister Whitfield Nottage from the Bahamas and a "Christian feminist mother" Captilda Gardiner Nottage from the Bahamas on October 4, 1927, Tucker was the tenth of thirteen children. Tucker attended Temple University and the University of Pennsylvania's Wharton School of Business. Tucker was later the recipient of two honorary doctoral degrees from Morris College in Sumter, South Carolina, Baptist Training Union in Philadelphia, Pennsylvania, and California State University Northridge  in California, and for this reason, she is sometimes referred to as "Dr. C. Delores Tucker".

Career

Civil activities
Tucker had a long history in the Civil Rights Movement. Early on, her civil activities included participating in the 1965 Selma to Montgomery marches alongside the Rev. Dr. Martin Luther King Jr. and raising funds for the NAACP. In 1990, Tucker, along with 15 other African American women and men, formed the African-American Women for Reproductive Freedom. She was the convening founder and national chair of the National Congress of Black Women, Inc. (NCBW), having succeeded the Hon. Shirley Chisholm in 1992.

Tucker also was responsible for the Governor's appointment of more women judges and more women and African Americans to boards and commissions than ever before. She also led the effort to make Pennsylvania one of the first states to pass the Equal Rights Amendment. As Chief of Elections of Pennsylvania, she was a leader in instituting a voter registration by mail and reducing the voting age from 21 to 18 years of age.

Political
In 1971, Tucker became the first black female Secretary of State when Pennsylvania Governor Milton Shapp appointed her Secretary of the Commonwealth of Pennsylvania. During her tenure, she instituted the first Commission on the Status of Women. Shapp fired Tucker in September 1977 for allegedly using state employees to write speeches for which she received honorariums. Two years later, one of Tucker's successors as Secretary of the Commonwealth, Dr. Ethel D. Allen, would also be fired for using public employees to write speeches.

She was the founder and president of the Bethune-DuBois Institute, Inc., which she established in 1991 to promote the cultural development of African American youth through scholarships and educational programs. Tucker also launched, and served as publisher of the publication, Vital Issues: The Journal of African American Speeches.

Media
In 1988 she made an extended appearance on a British television discussion programme, After Dark.

Hip-hop/rap music

Tucker dedicated much of the last few years of her life to condemning sexually explicit lyrics in rap and hip-hop tracks, citing a concern that the lyrics were misogynistic and threatened the moral foundation of the African American community.

Called "narrow-minded" by some rappers who often mentioned her in their lyrics, Tucker picketed stores that sold rap music and bought stock in Sony, Time Warner, and other companies in order to protest hip-hop at their shareholders' meetings. She also fought against the NAACP's decision to nominate late rapper Tupac Shakur for one of its Image Awards and filed a $10 million lawsuit against his estate for comments that the rapper made in his song "How Do U Want It?" on the album All Eyez on Me, in which Shakur rapped "C. Delores Tucker you's a motherfucker / Instead of trying to help a nigga you destroy a brother". In her lawsuit, Tucker claimed that comments in this song, and on the track "Wonda Why They Call U Bitch" from the same album, inflicted emotional distress, were slanderous and invaded her privacy. This case was eventually dismissed.

Other rappers have taken similar stances. In his song "Church for Thugs", The Game raps "I've got more hatred in my soul than Pac had for De'ores Tucker." Jay-Z chimes in as well, with the lines "I don't care if you're C. Dolores Tucker or you're Bill O'Reilly, you only riling me up," from The Black Album's "Threat." Lil' Kim also referenced her in a leftover track, entitled "Rockin' It", from her second studio album. Kim raps "C. Delores T., Screw her, I never knew her", after Tucker dubbed her music as "gangsta porno rap" and "filth".

Much of KRS-One and Channel Live's "Free Mumia" is a direct criticism of what the MCs see as Tucker's misplaced energy. Lil Wayne also referenced her a couple times, once on his leftover song "Million Dollar Baby" rapping "Can't be banned I'm sorry Miss Delores" and more recently on his Carter IV album song "Megaman" rapping "The heater ima Tucker, Tucker, like Delores." Tucker later went on to serve on the Advisory Board of the Parents Television Council until her death in 2005. Eminem referenced her in the song "Rap Game" by D12 rapping "Tell that C. Delores Tucker slut to suck a dick".

Accolades
Selected as one of 25 of the World's Most Intriguing People by People magazine,  Tucker was also selected as a People Magazine 1996 Yearbook Honoree, and was featured in the inaugural issue of John F. Kennedy, Jr.'s George magazine for her crusade against gangsta rap. In addition, she has been acknowledged for her deep concern for children by First Lady Hillary Clinton in the book It Takes A Village. The National Women's Political Caucus and Redbook also named her as the woman best qualified to be Ambassador to the United Nations.

For five consecutive years, from 1972 through 1977, she was listed as among Ebony magazine's 100 Most Influential Black Americans. During that period, she was listed as Ladies Home Journal Nominee for Woman of the Year in both 1975 and 1976. She was recognized by Ebony as one of the '100 Most Influential Black Organization Leaders' in the country in 2001 and 2002. Tucker was also a prominent member of Alpha Kappa Alpha sorority.

On April 25, 2006, a state historical marker honoring Tucker was unveiled by Bill Tucker and Governor Ed Rendell in a ceremony at the State Museum of Pennsylvania, in Harrisburg. In addition, it was announced that the North Building, which is adjacent to the State Capitol Building, was to be renamed the Secretary C. Delores Tucker Building. The state marker, which was commissioned by the Pennsylvania Historical and Museum Commission, was installed outside the entrance to the building.
The  marker reads:

Personal life and death
In 1951, Tucker married William Tucker, a successful Philadelphia real estate agent. Tucker herself had worked in real estate and insurance sales early in her career. Tucker had no children. She died on Wednesday, October 12, 2005, at Suburban Woods Health Center in Norristown, Pennsylvania, at the age of 78.  She is interred at West Laurel Hill Cemetery in Bala Cynwyd, PA.

References

External links
Official Website of the Philadelphia Congress of the National Congress of Black Women
Delores Tuckers's oral history video excerpts at The National Visionary Leadership Project

Interview of The Honorable C. Delores Tucker, 1982-12-10, In Black America, KUT Radio, American Archive of Public Broadcasting (WGBH and the Library of Congress)

1927 births
2005 deaths
Criticism of hip-hop
Politicians from Philadelphia
American people of Bahamian descent
Secretaries of the Commonwealth of Pennsylvania
Activists for African-American civil rights
Political activists from Pennsylvania
Philadelphia High School for Girls alumni
African-American women in politics
African-American gender relations in popular culture
Women in Pennsylvania politics
20th-century American politicians
Activists from Philadelphia
Pennsylvania Democrats
20th-century American women politicians
20th-century African-American women
20th-century African-American politicians
21st-century African-American people
21st-century African-American women